is a Japanese manga series written and illustrated by Ryu Fujisaki. It was serialized in Shueisha's magazine Weekly Shōnen Jump from August 2004 to May 2005. The series individual chapters were collected into four tankōbon (collected volumes) and published from January to July 2005 by Shueisha. It was later licensed in Northern America by Viz Media for an English-language publication, which was released from August 2009 to May 2010. It has been re-published by Shueisha, distributed as digital media by Viz Media, and localized in other countries.

Wāqwāq is set a world where humans have black blood and fear belligerent creatures known as "machines", entrusting their salvation on the Guardians—humans who possess weapons that give them supernatural powers—, and on the red-blooded Kami. The series focuses on Shio, a Guardian who meets Matsuda, who is believed to be Kami, and starts a journey in which he faces other adversaries who wants Kami's power. Its art and story was initially said to be confusing by some critics, but others stated that these aspects get better as the manga progress. It was described as a typical shōnen, but its characters and action have received mostly praise.

Plot 
Two millennia prior to the series' events, the humans create black-blooded androids to accomplish tasks to facilitate their lives. By combining these wishes with the Kami's red blood, a machine known as "Spider's Thread" will guarantee any wish—the magi hope the wish that will be fulfilled is to return the world to how it was before the war.

Shio meets , a red-blooded girl—brought from the past by the magi—whom is believed to be Kami. Shio and Matsuda—misled by Yoki—travel towards the Spider's Thread. On their way, Shio defeats several Guardians—the magi diffuse the ability the Kami's blood has to make the Guardians fight each other, aiming to fulfill the wish of the Guardian who overcome the others. Along the way, Shio befriends the robot , the Guardian , and the wannabe ninja . When they arrive at Spider's Thread, Shio is killed by Yoki and Koto reveals his real intention is to kill all . Resurrected by Matsuda's blood, Shio defeats Koto and wishes the  no longer exist. Kiku tells the machines not to attack the humans, Wāqwāq becomes a peaceful place, and Matsuda returns to her world.

Release
Wāqwāq, written and illustrated by Ryu Fujisaki, was originally serialized in the magazine Weekly Shōnen Jump from August 30, 2004, to May 9, 2005. Shueisha compiled its 34 chapters into four tankōbon (collected volumes) and released them from January 5, 2005, to July 4, 2005. Later, on November 18, 2008, Shueisha started to re-release the series in a bunkoban edition, which spawned three volumes, with the last one being published on January 16, 2009.

At the 2008 Comic-Con, Viz Media announced that it had licensed Wāqwāq for an English-language translation in Northern America. Viz Media published a preview of the first chapter on the August 2009 issue of its magazine Shonen Jump, and the volumes from August 4, 2009, to May 4, 2010. The series was also localized in Hong Kong by Culturecom, in Italy by Star Comics, and in Singapore by Chuang Yi. A digital version of the volumes were also available by Viz Media which released them from June 25, 2013, to August 13, 2013.

Volume list

Reception
Two volumes appeared on the list of the Diamond Comic Distributors's 300 best-selling graphic novels. The first volume sold an estimated 555 copies and appeared at the 205th spot for August 2009. The third volume sold about 290 copies and appeared at the 299th spot in February 2010.

Karen Maeda and Amanda Tarbet of Sequential Tart, Comic Book Bin's Leroy Douresseaux, Mania's Patricia Beard, Comic Book Resources's Michelle Smith, and Pop Culture Shock's Sam Kusek said its art to be confusing. On the contrary, Active Anime's Holly Ellingwood, ICv2's Steve Bennett, Anime News Network's Carlo Santos, and a Publishers Weeklys reviewer praised its art; it was said to be imaginative, and its character designs "full of unorthodox curves and lines ... look unlike anything else in the genre", according to Santos. Beard, Kusek and Tarbet criticized the story; the former qualified it as "poorly elaborated", and the latter two found the story lacked explanations about the plot. On the other hand, Ellingwood stated it is "an enthralling story" because there are mysteries to be discovered. Smith praised how the plot was elucidated a bit in the second volume, but still thought it was "convoluted" as in the first one. Douresseaux described that in the second volume "the narrative runs a lot smoother, unencumbered" and Fujisaki's art was "a lot of clearer". Douresseaux, Beard, Bennett, Santos and Kusek described it as having elements from a typical shōnen series. Conversely, Douresseaux stated "The eccentric narrative and the eclectic art makes the four-volume Wāqwāq unique graphical storytelling", while Ellingwood declared "The originality and creativity in the story and the art work make it a stand out from the norm in manga."

Regarding its characters, Maeda praised the variety, while Tarbet praised their "not only believable but realistic" motivations. Beard said the series has "memorable" characters, comparing Shio's personality to Gon Freecss from Hunter × Hunter. Zaki Zakaria of The Star commented that "the chemistry between Shio and Matsuda, despite requiring more work, is charming." On the other hand, Kusek asserted "I don't really think Shio is that strong of a lead", and Bennet criticized the non-development of the characters' relationships. Smith highlighted its post-apocalyptic setting as a reason to continue reading, but Douresseaux affirmed, "It's also a typical post-apocalyptic sci-fi series with the Mad Max-type violence watered down for young readers." Tarbet wrote that its mithology is the most appealing characteristic of the series and praised the battle scenes involving other characters than Shio. The action was also praised by Publishers Weekly, Ellingwood, Maeda, Santos, and Zakaria, who said "They are mandala-like battles of gorgeously drawn mechs straight out of the game Zone of the Enders, and of Gurren Lagann heights of crazy." Santos said it "does the remarkable" as reach "an epic finale" in only four volumes.

References

External links

2004 manga
Adventure anime and manga
Anime and manga about parallel universes
Post-apocalyptic anime and manga
Shōnen manga
Shueisha manga
Viz Media manga